Virgin Media is a British telecommunications company, founded in 2007, which provides telephone, television and internet services in the United Kingdom. Its headquarters are at Green Park in Reading, England. A range of videos advertising the company (many of which star Richard Branson and actor David Tennant) remain available on YouTube. It is owned by Virgin Media O2, a 50:50 joint venture between Liberty Global and Telefónica.

Virgin Media owns and operates its own fibre-optic cable network in the United Kingdom, although in most areas optical fibre does not reach customer premises, instead going to a nearby street cabinet to provide a fibre to the cabinet service. As of 31 December 2012, it had a total of approximately 4.8 million cable customers, of whom around 3.79 million were supplied with its television services (Virgin TV), around 4.2 million with broadband internet services and around 4.1 million with fixed-line telephony services. At the same date, it had around 3 million mobile telephony customers. Since the acquisition of Smallworld Cable in 2014, Virgin Media is the main cable provider in the UK, with the exception of WightFibre on the Isle of Wight, and covers 51% of UK households. Virgin Media competes primarily in broadband with Sky Group, BT Group and TalkTalk, and in mobile with EE, Vodafone and Three.

History

Origins

The company's origins lie in both Telewest and NTL, which merged in March 2006.

Telewest began in 1984 in Croydon under the name "Croydon Cable", and was acquired by United Cable of Denver in 1988. The company expanded during the 1990s and adopted the Telewest name in 1992 following the merger of its then-parent TCI and US West. It expanded into cable television access in 1999 by purchasing the remaining 50% stake in Cable London, one of the first cable TV companies in the UK, from NTL, adding 400,000 homes in north London. In April 2000 Telewest merged with Flextech, and in November extended its cable network with the acquisition of Eurobell, taking the total number of homes past 4.9 million.

NTL was established by Barclay Knapp and George Blumenthal in 1993 as "International CableTel", taking advantage of the deregulation of the UK cable market. Initially, Cabletel acquired local cable franchises covering Guildford, Northern Ireland and parts of Central Scotland and South Wales. In 1996, CableTel acquired National Transcommunications Limited (NTL), the privatised UK Independent Broadcasting Authority transmission network. In 1998 CableTel adopted "NTL" as its new name.

NTL purchased the ISP Virgin.net in 2004, having originally operated it as a joint venture with Virgin Group since it launched in November 1996. It sold ADSL broadband services through BT landlines to those living outside areas served by NTL's cable network and also offered subscription-based and subscription-free dial-up Internet access. Prior to acquiring Virgin.net, NTL offered a similar package called NTL Freedom.

Merger and Virgin Mobile acquisition 
Telewest and NTL began discussions about a merger in late 2003. Thanks to their geographically distinct areas, NTL and Telewest had co-operated previously, as in redirecting potential customers living outside their respective areas. On 3 October 2005, NTL announced a US$16 billion purchase of Telewest, to form one of the largest media companies in the UK. The merger agreement as structured would have required NTL to negotiate with BBC Worldwide (the BBC's commercial arm) due to a change-of-ownership clause written into the agreement for UKTV, a joint venture with Telewest's Flextech content division. To prevent this, Telewest instead acquired NTL.

In December 2005 NTL:Telewest and mobile virtual network operator (MVNO) Virgin Mobile UK announced that talks had taken place regarding a merger. Virgin Mobile's independent directors rejected the original bid of £817 million ($1.4 billion), taking the view that NTL's bid "undervalued the business". Sir Richard Branson reportedly expressed confidence that a restructured deal could go ahead, and in January 2006 NTL increased its offer to £961 million (372p per share). On 4 April 2006, NTL announced a £962.4 million recommended offer for Virgin Mobile. According to reports, Branson accepted a mix of shares and cash, making him a 10.7% shareholder of the combined company.

NTL and Telewest formally completed their merger on 3 March 2006, making the merged company the UK's largest cable provider, with more than 90% of the market. The combined company renamed itself NTL Incorporated, with ex-NTL shareholders controlling 75% of the stock and ex-Telewest shareholders 25%. Nine of the 11 directors of the new board came from NTL, with two from Telewest.

NTL:Telewest's takeover of Virgin Mobile completed on 4 July 2006, creating the UK's first 'quadruple play' media company, offering television, internet, mobile phone and fixed-line telephone services. The deal included a 30-year exclusive branding agreement
 that saw NTL adopt the "Virgin" name after it completed its merger with Telewest. NTL:Telewest announced on 8 November 2006 it would change its name to "Virgin Media Inc".

On 9 November 2006, NTL announced it had approached the commercial television broadcaster ITV plc about a proposed merger, after a similar announcement by ITV. BSkyB effectively blocked the merger on 17 November 2006 by controversially buying a 17.9% stake in ITV plc, a move that attracted anger from NTL shareholder Richard Branson, and an investigation from media and telecoms regulator Ofcom. On 6 December 2006 NTL announced that it had complained to the Office of Fair Trading about BSkyB's move, and would withdraw its attempt to buy ITV plc, stating it did not believe it could make a deal on favourable terms.

Rebrand as Virgin Media 

In November 2006, the company signed a deal with Sir Richard Branson to license the Virgin brand for the combined business. NTL Group's services – previously marketed under the NTL, Telewest and Virgin.net brands were merged with Virgin Mobile under the "Virgin Media" brand on 8 February 2007, referred to by Virgin as V Day. Virgin.net was integrated into the new brand as Virgin Media Beyond Cable (later Virgin Media National).

In February 2007, Virgin Central, an on-demand service, gained the rights to begin showing episodes of the television show Lost (already shown on Sky 1), and other shows including Alias and The OC. This service extended the on-demand service previously known as Teleport TV. Teleport TV was renamed TV Choice offering recently broadcast shows and other shows and series.

Dispute with Sky
A channel agreement for Virgin Media to keep non-premium Sky channels ended on 1 March 2007. Virgin Media and Sky failed to reach agreement on the issue, and Sky reacted by posting a letter to the public in major UK newspapers on 28 February 2007. Despite Sky's letter, Virgin Media blamed Sky for tyrannising them and inciting consumers to switch. The companies failed to resolve their differences, and subsequently after midnight on 1 March 2007, Virgin Media replaced the Sky1, Sky2, Sky Travel, Sky Travel Extra, Sky Sports News and Sky News channel content with a standard message. Sky attributed part of the rate rise to the fact that the new deal would also include Sky3, Sky Arts and undisclosed high definition and video on demand content. Sky said the deal would cost only 3p per customer per day (roughly £35,000,000 per year), but Virgin said that a minimum payment guarantee included in the contract meant that the actual amount due would exceed twice the payment.

The EPG name for Sky News was replaced with Old Sky Snooze.

On 2 March 2007 the National Consumer Council accused Sky and Virgin of "behaving like children" and stated that it would consider whether or not to raise a super-complaint against them "that will help to knock heads together" by the end of that month. Then on 5 March 2007 Virgin Media threatened to take legal action against BSkyB if the matter remained unresolved in 30 days. On 12 April 2007 Virgin Media filed a legal case in the High Court against BSkyB under the UK Competition Act 1998 and Article 82 of the EC Treaty. BSkyB claimed that Virgin Media made little effort to further arbitration. On 9 May 2008 it was reported that Virgin Media and Sky had held talks to resolve the dispute.

On 4 November 2008 it was announced that an agreement had been struck for Sky's Basic channels – including Sky1, Sky2, Sky3, Sky News, Sky Sports News, Sky Arts 1, Sky Arts 2, Sky Real Lives and Sky Real Lives 2 to return to Virgin Media from 13 November 2008 until 12 June 2011. In exchange Sky would provide continued carriage of Virgin Media Television's channels – Living, Livingit, Bravo, Bravo +1, Challenge, Challenge Jackpot and Virgin1 for the same period. The agreements include fixed annual carriage fees of £30m for the channels with both channel suppliers able to secure additional capped payments if their channels meet certain performance-related targets. As part of the agreements, both Sky and Virgin Media agreed to terminate all High Court proceedings against each other relating to the carriage of their respective basic channels.

On 26 August 2009 the Advertising Standards Authority upheld claims made by Virgin Media in its marketing, despite a complaint from Sky.

Liberty Global ownership
Until 2013, the company was listed on the NASDAQ Stock Market and the London Stock Exchange. On 5 February 2013, Liberty Global announced that they had agreed to buy Virgin Media for approximately US$23.3 billion (£15 billion) in a stock and cash merger. On 15 April, EU regulatory approval for the deal was granted, the final hurdle in the acquisition. On 4 June, shareholders approved the acquisition and the deal was completed on 7 June.

On 3 February 2014, Virgin Media acquired Smallworld Fibre, a cable provider based in North West England and Western Scotland, for an undisclosed fee. Smallworld's network was merged into Virgin Media's during 2014.

In November 2014, Virgin Media reached an agreement to sell its ADSL business to TalkTalk Group, allowing Virgin to focus on its cable broadband offering. Virgin began transferring customers to TalkTalk in February 2015.

On 20 July 2018, it was announced that Virgin Media would stop broadcasting all of the UKTV channels from 22 July 2018 over fees and an issue with Virgin's on-demand broadcasting rights. The companies were not able to agree terms to allow the ten channels and their +1 and HD offshoots to continue to be available on the platform and the channels stopped being available at just after midnight on 22 July 2018 with Virgin replacing the UKTV channels on their service with other networks. This led to a backlash by customers with some threatening to leave. The dispute finally ended after three weeks on 11 August 2018 after Virgin Media and UKTV reached an agreement. Virgin Media gradually restored all 10 UKTV channels with their +1 and HD Simulcast channels along with now added simulcast GOLD HD and the reinstalled UKTV Play app. The app now features five times the amount of more on-demand content now available. All UKTV Channels and UKTV app were all completely restored to Virgin Media platforms by 15 August 2018.

Merger with O2

On 7 May 2020, Liberty Global reached an agreement with Telefónica to merge their UK businesses, Virgin Media and O2, in a deal worth £31bn, subject to regulatory approval by the Competition and Markets Authority. The CMA approved the merger on 19 May 2021, and the merger was completed on 1 June 2021. This created one of the UK's largest entertainment and telecommunications companies, to rival BT Group. The resulting company is called VMED O2 UK Limited, operating as Virgin Media O2.

Operations

Virgin Broadband 

The broadband division combines NTL's cable-broadband operations (broadband Internet access connections through cable), Blueyonder (Telewest's cable-broadband operations) and Virgin.net (ADSL, broadband Internet access through a non-cable telephone line).

Virgin Broadband in cabled areas is marketed as "fibre optic broadband". It is a FTTN network, where fibre optic trunk lines are used to connect the area's headend to cabinets on the street.

In July 2009 and 2010, Virgin Media Broadband came first in an Ofcom broadband speed test in the UK. Ofcom tested typical speeds of broadband services provided by most ISPs in the UK, including BSkyB, BT, Tiscali, AOL, TalkTalk, Plusnet, O2 and Orange. Since most broadband connections in the UK are provided by ADSL, and the quality of individual phone lines varies according to distance from exchange, most landline broadband services are marketed as being the maximum speed that the individual's phone line will support, "up to 8mb". As a result, actual speeds obtained vary greatly, but are always constrained by the individual phone line – the quality of which is out of the control of the broadband provider. Cable broadband has no such speed variability caused by connection quality as the network is fully owned and controlled by the cable company providing the broadband – any slowdowns are wholly as a result of traffic shaping, or local capacity being over-sold or over-subscribed. For this reason, the results showed that Virgin Media's broadband speed was closer to (although still not 100% of) the "up to" figures it advertised, compared to the other providers tested. While landline broadband providers offered rates of "up to" 24 Mbit/s, the launch of a Virgin's 50 Mbit/s service on 15 December 2008 was advertised as "the UK's Fastest Broadband."

On 8 October 2009, Virgin Media began trials to deliver its TV and broadband services at up to 50 Mbit/s downstream via a VDSL2 line to a roadside cabinet. The cabinets were linked to Virgin Media backhaul via new fibre laid by Vtesse Networks through BT's local exchange, 5 km away. As well as broadband, Virgin Media offered its full range of TV services, including high definition and on demand, over the new infrastructure.

On 11 March 2010, Virgin Media announced a six-month trial using telephone poles to deliver 50 Mbit/s broadband and TV services to the Berkshire village of Woolhampton. Virgin Media identified more than one million homes in parts of the UK that could benefit from deployment over telephone poles, without the need for government subsidy. During July the trial was extended to existing commercial infrastructure in the Welsh village of Crumlin, Caerphilly.

On 7 October 2010, Ofcom ordered BT to open up its fibre-optic network to competing broadband providers to help drive forward the rollout of high-speed internet services in the UK. Ofcom further ordered BT to free up access to network infrastructure – including all telephone poles and underground ducts – for the rollout of broadband to areas BT does not plan to reach. Virgin Media confirmed plans to expand its broadband network in the UK by using the infrastructure owned by BT. By using the approach, the company hoped to expand its network to reach as many as 16 million of the UK's 26m homes.

On 27 October 2010, Virgin Media announced its 100 Mbit/s downstream broadband service, featuring 10 Mbit/s upstream rates, which went on sale on 8 December 2010. Early service areas were parts of London, the South East and Yorkshire. With the faster upstream rates specifically, it expects the uptake in cloud computing services will also see an increase. The roll-out was expected to be complete by mid-2012.

On 11 January 2012, Virgin Media announced plans to double the speeds of selected broadband packages; its 10 Mbit/s package will increase to 20 Mbit/s, 20 Mbit/s and 30 Mbit/s to 60 Mbit/s, 50 Mbit/s to 100 Mbit/s, and its 100 Mbit/s package to 120 Mbit/s. The roll-out is expected to begin in February 2012 and be completed by mid-2013, at a cost of £110m. Since the announcement, Virgin Media has confirmed that it now plans to also upgrade 50Mbit/s customers to 120Mbit/s at no extra cost, in effect cutting the monthly fee for existing 100Mbit/s customers.

On 11 November 2013, Virgin Media announced its 152 Mbit/s downstream broadband service, featuring 12 Mbit/s upstream rates, which started rolling out to customers from 28 February 2014. The company also upgraded existing customers, from 30Mb to 50Mb, 60Mb to 100Mb, and 120Mb to the new 152Mb service. The rollout is expected to be completed by early 2015.

In February 2015, Virgin Media announced its biggest investment in broadband infrastructure in over a decade. Set to invest £3bn in improving its fibre optic broadband network, Virgin Media will be increasing the network's reach from 13 million to 17 million homes.

On 29 September 2015, Virgin Media announced its broadband packages would be rebranded as Vivid. The company will upgrade existing customers from 50Mbit/s to 70Mbit/s, 100Mbit/s to 150Mbit/s and 152Mbit/s to 200Mbit/s. The speed upgrade will be rolled out to 90% of customers by the end of 2015.

On 22 March 2017, Virgin Media made ultrafast speeds standard with new bundles. 100Mbit/s entry level rising to top speed of 300Mbit/s. On 29 April 2019, Virgin Media unveiled a new bundle with a download speed of 500Mbit/s; due to Virgin Media's practice of over-provisioning, this bundle can expect average speeds of 516Mbit/s and a max of 575Mbit/s.

On 30 September 2019, Virgin Media announced their new Gig1 package rollout, providing download speeds up to 1140Mbit/s (over 1Gbit/s) and upload speeds up to 52Mbit/s, starting in Southampton, which has subsequently rolled out to selected major cities and their surrounding areas across the UK including Manchester, Leeds, Edinburgh and Glasgow. This is being provided through upgrades to downstream to DOCSIS 3.1, with upload speeds still limited to DOCSIS 3.0 upstream infrastructure. They aim to finish the rollout across the entire Virgin Media network by the end of 2021.

On 29 June 2020, Virgin Media announced that customers on their "Ultimate Oomph" broadband, TV and phone package would receive a free speed boost from their M500 package to their new M600 package, replacing 516 Mbps download and 36 Mbps upload with 636 Mbps download and 41 Mbps upload. The free upgrades were completed for all customers by 31 March 2021. M600 is only available through the Ultimate Oomph package bundle.

Bandwidth throttling 
Virgin Media maintain on their consumer website that they do not throttle users' download or upload bandwidth.

However, Virgin Media did originally employ a form of bandwidth throttling whereby customer bandwidth was reduced temporarily after a threshold was reached during peak periods. The company experimented with and revised all parameters involved in the throttling, such as threshold size, peak period definitions, throttling percentage and duration. Separate thresholds were applied to upstream and downstream, and thresholds varied between packages.

In 2013, Virgin Media changed their traffic management policy to the detriment of their customers. The policy stated a maximum throttling amount of 40% on most services, however users reported being throttled by as much as 54%. Virgin Media's advertisements regarding their "unlimited" broadband services, and their controversial traffic management were investigated by the Advertising Standards Authority, after having previous advertisements banned.

From 28 February 2014, Virgin Media announced that they were scrapping traffic management for downstream traffic on 30 Mbps or higher packages. As a result of this, 30 Mbps or higher packages were only throttled on the upstream, where as 20 Mbps or below packages were throttled on both the upstream and the downstream. Sometime after this Virgin Media changed their policy again due to further feedback from customers, and they now state on their website that no matter what broadband package users have taken, they will not be subject to any bandwidth throttling.

Usenet servers 
Virgin Media customers may use Usenet servers (NNTP) with the address "news.virginmedia.com". These servers are outsourced to the Highwinds Network Group and are physically based in Amsterdam, Netherlands. Virgin Media also hosts another operational Usenet server previously known as "text.news.ntlworld.com", now "text.news.virginmedia.com", which again has certain restrictions and limits article size to 50kb.

London Underground 
In March 2012, Virgin Media won an exclusive contract to provide Wi-Fi access to London Underground platforms until 2017. The company announced mobile internet at 80 stations by July 2012 and a further 40 stations by the end of 2012. The service, which gives access to mobile internet via a TfL portal offering travel, news and entertainment bulletins, will remain free for Virgin Media customers, along with customers of partnered companies, such as Vodafone and EE, after the 2012 Summer Olympics. Other users will only be able to access a limited amount of free content on the TfL portal, with full mobile internet services offered on a pay-as-you-go basis.

Virgin Media Business 

On 11 February 2010, ntl:Telewest Business was rebranded as Virgin Media Business, marking the end of the NTL and Telewest brand being used by the company. The company provides dedicated internet and telecommunications services to businesses.

Virgin Mobile 

Virgin Media owns Virgin Mobile Telecoms Limited, a UK-based Mobile Virtual Network Operator (MVNO) with contracts to use EE's carrier network, with over four million subscribers.

From 2021, Virgin Mobile will enter into a contract with Vodafone UK to use their network instead. The contract is due to expire some time in 2026.

Virgin Phone 
Virgin Phone offers landline telephone services; it ranks as the number two service behind the former UK state monopoly, BT Group.

On 1 April 2010, Virgin Media began to offer free home phone to mobile calls. Virgin Phone customers are able to call Virgin Mobile customers at no charge, within the Talk Plan specified periods.

Virgin TV 

Virgin TV, the digital cable television service from Virgin Media,  ranks as the UK's second largest pay TV service, having 3.6m subscribers, compared to BSkyB's 8.2m as of Q3 2007.

 55% of UK households potentially have access to Virgin's network, while anyone in the UK with a line-of-sight view of the Astra & Eurobird satellites at 28.2° east has the ability to receive Sky's service.

Channels 
Virgin TV carries around 300 digital television and radio channels, including a mixture of subscription, premium subscription and pay-per-view channels.

Former operations

Virgin Media Television 

Virgin Media Television (formerly Flextech) was the content subsidiary of Virgin Media, and operated a number of wholly owned channels including Bravo, LIVING, Trouble and Challenge. It launched Virgin1 on Freeview and cable on 1 October 2007, replacing Ftn on Freeview.

On 4 June 2010, Virgin Media announced that they had reached an agreement to sell Virgin Media Television to BSkyB, subject to regulatory approval. The acquisition expanded Sky's portfolio of basic pay TV channels and eliminated the carriage fees it previously paid for distributing VMtv channels on its TV services. In parallel, the companies reached a number of agreements providing for the carriage of certain Sky standard and high-definition (HD) channels, including securing new carriage agreements for wholesale distribution of Sky's basic channel line-up, including Sky 1 and Sky Arts, and the newly acquired VMtv channels, on Virgin Media's cable TV service.

On 29 June 2010, the Irish Competition Authority cleared the proposed transaction. BSkyB and Virgin Media announced the completion of the acquisition on 13 July 2010, following Irish regulatory approval. VMtv was then renamed the Living TV Group. In completing the acquisition, Sky paid Virgin Media an initial £105 million with up to an additional £55 million to be paid upon UK regulatory clearance.

On 20 July 2010, the Office of Fair Trading (OFT) announced they would review BSkyB's acquisition of Virgin Media Television to judge whether it posed any competition concerns in the UK. On 14 September 2010, the OFT decided not to refer BSkyB's takeover of Virgin Media's TV channels to the Competition Commission.

Virgin1 was also a part of the deal but was rebranded as Channel One on 3 September 2010, as the Virgin name was not licensed to Sky. The new carriage deals were for up to nine years. Previously the carriage deals tended to be struck every three years.

Sit-up 

Virgin Media owned Sit-up Ltd, a UK-based broadcaster of home shopping television channels, as a joint venture from its launch in 2000 and in full from May 2005. It operated the channels Bid TV, Price Drop TV and Speed Auction TV, shown on digital satellite, cable, and terrestrial television and the internet.

On 1 April 2009, Virgin Media confirmed it had sold Sit-up to Aurelius AG for an unspecified amount.

Virgin Media Pioneers
Virgin Media Pioneers was an online community for British entrepreneurs, providing tips, advice and networking. Founded in 2010, the company was an initiative of Virgin Media. 

In 2011 Virgin Media Pioneers launched the Control Shift Campaign which polled over 1,600 young aspiring entrepreneurs on changes the government could make to help them create new businesses. The campaign resulted in the introduction of a £10 million Youth Enterprise Loan.

UKTV 

UKTV is a digital cable and satellite television network, formed through a joint venture between BBC Worldwide, a commercial subsidiary of the BBC, and Virgin Media. It is one of the United Kingdom's largest television companies. UKTV's channels are available via satellite and cable in the UK and Ireland. In the UK, on digital terrestrial television, Yesterday and Dave are available on the Freeview platform. W (formerly Watch) is the flagship channel operated by the network; it is a general entertainment channel that launched on 7 October 2008.

On 15 August 2011, Virgin Media agreed to sell its 50% stake in UKTV to Scripps Networks Interactive in a deal worth £339m. Scripps paid £239m in cash, and about £100m to acquire the outstanding preferred stock and debt owed by UKTV to Virgin Media. Completion of the transaction was contingent on regulatory approvals in Ireland and Jersey, which was received on 3 October 2011. Related to the transaction, Scripps Networks Interactive and BBC Worldwide are negotiating an agreement whereby, after completion, BBC Worldwide would have the option, via a combination of cash and a package of digital rights for UKTV, to increase its shareholding from 50% to a maximum of 60%. Scripps Networks Interactive's existing voting rights and board representation would be unaffected by this proposed arrangement, which would be subject to BBC Executive and BBC Trust approvals.

Corporate affairs

Ownership
Following the completion of the merger between NTL and Telewest, and the acquisition of Virgin Mobile, the company agreed a 30-year licensing agreement with Sir Richard Branson's Virgin Group to use the Virgin brand, with a ten-year opt-out clause. Branson accepted a mix of shares and cash, making him a 10.7% shareholder of the combined company at the time.

In July 2007, Virgin Group hedged 37% of its stake in Virgin Media for $224m through a collared loan agreement with Credit Suisse, a transaction which enabled it to retain the voting and dividend rights. Virgin Group had the option of buying back the 12.8m Virgin Media shares it had mortgaged after two years, but in May 2009 decided against this. The funds were used at the time by Virgin Group to invest in other areas of its business, such as Virgin Green Fund, which was launched in September 2007, Virgin America and Virgin Mobile India. By December 2009, Sir Richard Branson's Virgin Entertainment Investment Holdings Limited held a minority holding of 21,413,099 Virgin Media common stock, making him the third largest shareholder.

Liberty Global announced on 5 February 2013 that they had agreed to buy the company for approximately US$23.3 billion (£15 billion) in a stock and cash merger. Shareholders approved the acquisition on 4 June, and the deal was completed on 7 June.

Virgin Media's UK operations are ultimately controlled by a US Delaware organisation named Virgin Media (UK) Group Inc. Interested stakeholders cannot confirm who actually owns and controls Virgin Media due to Delaware company law not requiring disclosure of controlling ownership in annual reports made to the state. The company named Virgin Media (UK) Group LLC was closed and dissolved in 2016.

Market share
, Virgin Media has a 20% share of the broadband market, equal with Sky Broadband, and behind BT Total Broadband (on 31%). By 2016, its market share had dropped slightly to 19%, behind BT (32%) and Sky (23%).

Virgin Television has  around 3.4 million subscribers. 3.2 million of them are digital cable customers, and the other 200,000 are analogue cable customers. Virgin makes up around 15% of the UK's TV distributors, with Freeview having the most, and Sky being second.

Advertising 
Virgin Media launched in February 2007, with a public relations event and expensive advertising campaign covering major UK television channels, newspapers and billboards. Television advertising featured actress Uma Thurman, comedian Ruby Wax, and actors Samuel L. Jackson, Marc Warren, and David Tennant.

Virgin Media also sponsored the Channel 4 reality TV show Big Brother in its eighth series in 2007 and its Celebrity Hijack and ninth series in 2008.

In October 2010, Virgin Media airs its another campaign with a Looney Tunes character, Speedy Gonzales, he was also served as a mascot for the company and was plastered everywhere throughout the UK, the London Underground station, adverts that features him on the TV during advert breaks of The X Factor on ITV, appearing in-game, and throughout the web.

In 2012, Virgin Media launched a multimillion-pound ad campaign starring Usain Bolt and Virgin founder Sir Richard Branson to promote Virgin's superfast broadband service. The TV adverts were directed by Seth Gordon and involved Bolt impersonating Branson.

On 8 June 2016, Southampton F.C. announced that Virgin Media would become the club's shirt sponsor on a three-year deal.

Controversies

Net neutrality 
In April 2008, acting Virgin CEO Neil Berkett sparked controversy when he told Television, a magazine published by the Royal Television Society, "this net neutrality thing is a load of bollocks." According to the journalist, he claimed that any video content provider that refused to pay Virgin Media a premium for faster access would have to get stuck in "bus lanes," having their content delivered to end users at much slower speeds than that of paying content providers.

Widespread criticism of this policy was expressed on the internet, with large internet communities requesting that Virgin customers end their subscriptions and initiate a mass boycott.

According to Virgin Media, the comments in the article were taken out of context and misinterpreted. A statement released by the company states: "With Virgin Media rolling out a 50Mb service later this year, we are uniquely equipped to cope with the demand for new bandwidth-hungry services. We strongly support the principle that the internet should remain a space that is open to all and we have not called for content providers to pay for distribution. However, we recognise that as more customers turn to the web for content, different providers will have different needs and priorities and in the long term, it's legitimate to question how this demand will be managed. We welcome an informed debate on this issue."

Crackdown on illegal filesharing of copyrighted material 
On 2 April 2008, The Daily Telegraph reported that Virgin Media would be beginning a trial to take action against subscribers who are illegally downloading copyrighted material from internet Peer-to-peer (P2P) services. Information of offenders would be provided by the British Phonographic Industry, and then Virgin Media and the BPI sends a warning letter to the customer.

Virgin Media and the BPI denied reports of any agreement or pilot scheme and said they were only in talks on the matter. However, at least one person claimed to have received a letter threatening disconnection. Although the UK government backed plans to ban p2p users from the internet, it may soon be overturned by strong condemnation from the European Parliament on the grounds of privacy issues and the importance of internet access.

In July 2008, the BBC reported that 800 Virgin Media customers who the BPI claim are sharing copyrighted files were sent warning letters in envelopes marked "If you don't read this, your broadband connection could be disconnected". At least one recipient of the letter denied any wrongdoing by any authorised user of his broadband connection.

On 26 November 2009, it was revealed that Virgin Media would trial deep packet inspection technology to measure the level of illegal file sharing on its network. The CView system, provided by Detica, will look at traffic and identify the peer-to-peer packets. It will then peer inside those packets and try to determine what is licensed and what is unlicensed, based on data provided by the record industry. The trial – which has no scheduled end date – will cover about 40% of Virgin Media's network but those involved will not be informed. Virgin Media emphasised that it is seeking to measure the overall level of illegal file sharing, not to keep records on individual customers. Data on the level of copyright infringement will be aggregated and anonymised.

On 22 January 2010, the European Commission confirmed that although it had not discussed the matter with Virgin Media, it would "closely monitor" the trial. Privacy International announced that it would press a criminal complaint with the Metropolitan Police, because it argued that under the Privacy and Electronic Communications (EC Directive) Regulations (PECR) and the Regulation of Investigatory Powers Act (RIPA) as well as the European ePrivacy Directive, interception and processing of communications requires either explicit informed consent from all parties or a warrant.

On 3 May 2012, it was reported that Virgin Media had become the first ISP in the UK to implement a web filter to block access to The Pirate Bay, in compliance with a UK High Court order in April, although there continues to be a great number of mirrors, proxies, or VPNs, so this has proved unsuccessful.

Charging exit fees 
Virgin Media charges customers exit fees when they move to a location where they are unable to receive Virgin Media services. Ofcom is investigating Virgin Media for this practice and was due to make a preliminary decision in April 2018. In an update in May 2018, Ofcom reported that it had reasonable grounds to believe that Virgin had contravened one of its General Conditions by: setting and charging customers early termination charges (ETCs) which were too high; requiring customers moving house to an area within Virgin's network to sign up to a new fixed term contract or pay ETCs; and failing to take action to ensure that its conditions and procedures for contract termination did not act as disincentives to its customers against changing provider. Ofcom also found it had reasonable grounds for believing Virgin had contravened another General Condition when it failed to publish on its website clear and up-to-date information about the ETCs payable when fixed term contracts are terminated.

Data pimping 
In early 2008, it was announced that the ISP arm of Virgin Media had entered into a contract (along with BT and TalkTalk) with the former spyware company Phorm (responsible under their 121Media guise for the Apropos rootkit) to intercept and analyse their users' click-stream data, and sell the anonymised aggregate information as part of Phorm's OIX advertising service. The practice, which has become known as "data pimping", came under intense fire from various internet communities and other interested parties who believe that the interception of data is illegal under UK law (RIPA). At a more fundamental level, many have argued that the ISPs and Phorm have no right to sell a commodity (a user's data) to which they have no claim of ownership.

Though Phorm initially claimed Virgin Media had signed an exclusive contract and were committed to implementing Phorm's Webwise tracking system, Virgin Media have since distanced themselves from this and now state that they have only signed a preliminary contract with Phorm to better understand the tracking technology, and are under no obligation to implement it. Reports on the Guardian website in May 2008 suggested Virgin Media may be further distancing themselves from the controversial system.

Wikipedia censorship 

In December 2008, Virgin Media was one of several ISPs in the UK to attempt to censor its users' access to the Wikipedia article about the 1976 album Virgin Killer by stadium rock band Scorpions. The album cover has generated controversy, as it features the partially obscured image of a naked, underage girl. The Wikipedia article includes this image and its URL was blacklisted by the Internet Watch Foundation after a user complaint. The blacklisting has since been rescinded.

Security issues

10-month exposure to data theft 
In March 2020, it became known that the Virgin Media marketing database accommodating the personal details (phone numbers, home and email addresses) of 900,000 users was left unsecured for 10 months. The company admitted that a member of their staff hadn't followed the correct security procedures, which resulted in the system's vulnerability. It is known for sure that at least one occasion of unauthorised access took place throughout these 10 months. After shutting down access, a forensic investigation was launched to gauge the extent of the damage and determine whether any data had been leaked.

See also 
 Virgin Media Television (Ireland) – a separate Liberty Global subsidiary which acquired TV channels from TV3 Group in 2015.

References

External links 
 
 
 Virgin Media Business
 Virgin Mobile

 
Virgin Media O2
British brands
British subsidiaries of foreign companies
Television networks in the United Kingdom
Cable television companies of the United Kingdom
British companies established in 2006
Telecommunications companies established in 2006
Companies based in Reading, Berkshire
Companies formerly listed on the Nasdaq
Companies formerly listed on the London Stock Exchange
Internet service providers of the United Kingdom
Liberty Global
2013 mergers and acquisitions
2021 mergers and acquisitions